The Wandering Jews is a short non-fiction book (1926–27) by Joseph Roth about the plight of the Jews in the mid-1920s who, with other refugees and displaced persons in the aftermath of World War I, the Russian Revolution and the redrawing of national frontiers following the Treaty of Versailles, had fled to the West from Lithuania, Poland and Russia. "They sought shelter in cities and towns where most of them had never been and, unfortunately, where they were made despicably unwelcome." Poverty stricken villagers, they were set apart by their origins, their piety and their dress. In the last five months of 1926 he visited the Soviet Union where he wrote the final section, The Condition of the Jews in Soviet Russia. Walter Jens called it the best book on its subject in German. An English translation by Michael Hofmann was published in 2001.

Attitudes
Joseph Roth wrote the book for, "readers with respect for pain, for human greatness, and for the squalor that everywhere accompanies misery; Western Europeans who are not merely proud of their clean mattresses." The book displays his "lifelong sympathies with simple people, the dispossessed guests on this earth and his antipathy to a selfish, materialistic, and increasingly homogeneous bourgeoisie." Roth is warm to his subjects, with "the exception of the middle-class, assimilated, denying Jews in the West." Jews in Germany and France, believing themselves to be assimilated, tended to look down on the newcomers to the West. And, "Roth sensed that  the countries of Europe, stumbling out of one war and into another, floored by inflation, willing victims of atrocious right-wing propaganda and nationalist rhetoric would not be hospitable to the Jews who were being turned out of the East."

Born in Galicia, a Central European province of the Habsburg Empire, Roth witnessed the end of this empire, yet continued to call it his only homeland. He regarded it as "something that contained multitudes, something not exclusive", and, according to his English translator Michael Hoffman, the Jews represented  "human beings in their least packaged form" - "the most anomalous, individual of peoples", fissured by history and geography. Roth believed in "Judaism, in the sense of a somewhat separate presence of Jews within and throughout and inspiriting Europe." Communism he believed would eliminate anti-semitism and Jewish identity alike. He never went to Palestine, but he objected to the creation of a nation state there for the Jews.  "The young halutz is also the disseminator of a culture. He is as much a European as he is a Jew".

In a preface to the 1937 edition, all Roth could hope for, Michael Hofmann wrote in the 2001 edition, was for "conditions for Jews getting steadily and bearably worse. What happened instead was the Holocaust."

References

1927 non-fiction books
Austrian books
Works by Joseph Roth
Works about the interwar period
Books about refugees
Books about Jews and Judaism